Mamadou Diop Gaye (born 14 February 1993) is a professional basketball player who last played for Melco Ieper of the Top Division 1, the second basketball tier of Belgium.

Player profile
Diop is a tall forward who can play as a small forward or power forward. He has great physical and athletic attributes, but also has a good outside shot and a variety of movements. His speed allows him to run the counter-attack and he also has very good play vision.

Professional career
Mamadou Diop Gaye came to Spain in 2008 to play for the youth teams of Villa de Adeje. Years later he moved to Laboral Kutxa, starting to play in a 2011–12 season with their reserve team in the fifth tier, only to finish the season in UPV Álava of Liga EBA (fourth division). Over the season, he has shown solid performances, averaging 12 points and 4 rebounds per game. In a 2012–13 season he was sent on loan to the CEBA Guadalajara of the LEB Plata (third tier), reaching with his team the semifinals of the promotion playoffs to LEB Oro (second tier). In the 2013–14 he was again loaned in order to continue his development in Conservas de Cambados of the same league.

For the 2014–15 season, Diop made the roster of Laboral Kutxa for the Liga ACB. On September 2, he debuted and scored his first points in a preseason game against Gipuzkoa Basket. On December 28, Diop made his first appearance in the ACB, against Baloncesto Sevilla.

On June 28, 2016, Diop parted ways with Baskonia and signed with Belgian club Melco Ieper.

International appearances
Diop has played in the Spain national youth teams.

In summer 2010, he was selected by Diego Ocampo to participate with the U-17 team in the 2010 World Championship in Hamburg, Germany.

In April 2011, he played with the U-18 team in the Vilagarcía Basket Cup.

In 2012, he was selected by Luis Guil to participate in the European U-20 Championships in Slovenia.

In 2013 he was again shortlisted with the U-20 team, this time coached by Sito Alonso, to participate in the 2013 European Championship.

Personal life
Diop has a younger brother, Ilimane, who plays for Laboral Kutxa Baskonia.

Trophies
With CEBA Guadalajara
 Copa LEB Plata (2013)

References

External links
 Mamadou Diop at acb.com
 Mamadou Diop at draftexpress.com
 Mamadou Diop at eurobasket.com
 Mamadou Diop at euroleague.net
 

1993 births
Living people
Liga ACB players
Power forwards (basketball)
Saski Baskonia players
Senegalese men's basketball players
Small forwards
Spanish men's basketball players